Pan Kou-ang (born 8 December 1939) is a Taiwanese former sports shooter. He competed at the 1964 Summer Olympics and the 1968 Summer Olympics. He also competed at the 1966 Asian Games.

References

1939 births
Living people
Taiwanese male sport shooters
Olympic shooters of Taiwan
Shooters at the 1964 Summer Olympics
Shooters at the 1968 Summer Olympics
People from Nanhai District
Asian Games medalists in shooting
Shooters at the 1966 Asian Games
Taiwanese people from Guangdong
Asian Games bronze medalists for Chinese Taipei
Medalists at the 1966 Asian Games
20th-century Taiwanese people